Eleventh Amendment may refer to:

 The Eleventh Amendment to the United States Constitution, restricting the ability to sue states in Federal court
 The Eleventh Amendment of the Constitution of Ireland, which permits the state to ratify the Maastricht Treaty
 The Eleventh Amendment of the Constitution of South Africa